Erwin Thijs (born 6 August 1970 in Tongeren) is a former Belgian professional road bicycle racer. He competed in the individual road race at the 1992 Summer Olympics.

Palmarès 

1987
 2nd, National U17 Road Race Championship
1992
 1st, Overall, Circuit Franco-Belge
1993
 1st, Hel van het Mergelland
1994
 1st, Stage, Circuit de la Sarthe
1996
 1st, Brussels-Ingooigem
1997
 1st, Stage 2, Circuito Montañés
1998
 1st, Flèche Ardennaise
 1st, kermesse in Dilsen
 7th, Grand Prix des Nations
1999
 1st, kermesses in Jülich & Dortmund
2000
 1st, Ronde van Limburg
 1st, Points Competition, Ster der Beloften
 Winner Stages 2 & 3
 1st, Stage 3, Dekra Open
2001
 1st, kermesses in Stekene, Strombeek-Bever & Wingene
2002
 1st, Stadsprijs Geraardsbergen
 1st, Stage 4, Tour de Wallonie
2003
 1st, Flèche Hesbignonne
2004
1st Grote Prijs Beeckman-De Caluwé
2005
 1st, Stage 4, Ster Elektrotoer
 13th, Paris–Roubaix
2006
 1st, Colliers Classic
 1st, Flèche Hesbignonne
 1st, Stage 6, Peace Race

References

External links 

1970 births
Living people
Belgian male cyclists
People from Tongeren
Cyclists from Limburg (Belgium)
Olympic cyclists of Belgium
Cyclists at the 1992 Summer Olympics